In mathematics, a group extension is a general means of describing a group in terms of a particular normal subgroup and quotient group.

Since any finite group  possesses a maximal normal subgroup  with simple factor group , all finite groups may be constructed as a series of extensions with finite simple groups. This fact was a motivation for completing the classification of finite simple groups.

Extensions in general

One extension, the direct product, is immediately obvious.

cf. the Ext functor.  Several other general classes of extensions are known but no theory exists that treats all the possible extensions at one time. Group extension is usually described as a hard problem; it is termed the extension problem.

Extension problem

The classification of finite simple groups gives us a complete list of finite simple groups; so the solution to the extension problem would give us enough information to construct and classify all finite groups in general.

Classifying extensions

Solving the extension problem amounts to classifying all extensions of H by K; or more practically, by expressing all such extensions in terms of mathematical objects that are easier to understand and compute.  In general, this problem is very hard, and all the most useful results classify extensions that satisfy some additional condition.

It is important to know when two extensions are equivalent or congruent. We say that the extensions  
 
and  

are equivalent (or congruent) if there exists a group isomorphism  making commutative the diagram of Figure 1.
In fact it is sufficient to have a group homomorphism; due to the assumed commutativity of the diagram, the map  is forced to be an isomorphism by the short five lemma.

Warning

Trivial extensions
A trivial extension is an extension

that is equivalent to the extension

Classifying split extensions

A split extension is an extension

with a homomorphism  such that going from H to G by s and then back to H by the quotient map of the short exact sequence induces the identity map on H i.e., .  In this situation, it is usually said that s splits the above exact sequence.

Warning on terminology

In general in mathematics, an extension of a structure K is usually regarded as a structure L of which K is a substructure. See for example field extension. However, in group theory the opposite terminology has crept in, partly because of the notation , which reads easily as extensions of Q by N, and the focus is on the group Q.

A paper of Ronald Brown and Timothy Porter on Otto Schreier's theory of nonabelian extensions uses the terminology that an extension of K gives a larger structure.

Central extension
A central extension''' of a group G is a short exact sequence of groups

Examples of central extensions can be constructed by taking any group G and any abelian group A, and setting E to be . This kind of split example   corresponds to the element 0 in  under the above correspondence. More serious examples are found in the theory of projective representations, in cases where the projective representation cannot be lifted to an ordinary linear representation.

In the case of finite perfect groups, there is a universal perfect central extension.

Similarly, the central extension of a Lie algebra  is an exact sequence

There is a general theory of central extensions in Maltsev varieties.

Generalization to general extensions

Lie groups

In Lie group theory, central extensions arise in connection with algebraic topology. Roughly speaking, central extensions of Lie groups by discrete groups are the same as covering groups.

is a group homomorphism, and surjective.

The basic examples of central extensions as covering groups are:
 the spin groups, which double cover the special orthogonal groups, which (in even dimension) doubly cover the projective orthogonal group.
 the metaplectic groups, which double cover the symplectic groups.
The case of  involves a fundamental group that is infinite cyclic. Here the central extension involved is well known in modular form theory, in the case of forms of weight . A projective representation that corresponds is the Weil representation, constructed from the Fourier transform, in this case on the real line. Metaplectic groups also occur in quantum mechanics.

See also
Lie algebra extension
Virasoro algebra
HNN extension
Group contraction
Extension of a topological group

References

 R.L. Taylor, Covering  groups  of  non  connected topological  groups, Proceedings of the American Mathematical Society, vol. 5 (1954), 753–768.
 R. Brown and O. Mucuk, Covering groups of non-connected topological  groups revisited, Mathematical Proceedings of the Cambridge Philosophical Society'', vol. 115 (1994), 97–110.

Group theory